Yu Baofa (born in 1958) is a Chinese oncologist and researcher in intratumoral cancer therapy and drug development. He is the Founder, CEO and Chairman of Baofa Cancer Hospital Network China in Jinan, Beijing and Dongping. He also developed Ultra Minimum Incision Personalized Intra-Tumoral Chemo-Immuno (UMIPIC) Therapy.

Early life and education 
Yu was born in 1958 in Jinan, Shandong, China. During his childhood, the local doctors he saw in his village inspired him to become a physician in the future. He was educated in Binzhou Medical College. Four years later, he graduated and landed a job in the Shandong Tumor Research Institute and transferred to the China Academy of Medical Sciences for further studies in cancer.

In 1984, his mother was diagnosed with esophageal cancer and later died. Soon after, his best friend's father died of cancer as well. These experiences motivated him to deepen his research of cancer.

In 1985, Yu enrolled in Peking Union Medical College (tumour department) in Beijing to further his studies and received a master's degree of Medicine. After graduation, he worked at the China-Japan Friendship Hospital in Beijing for a year, before attending the School of Medicine of University of California, San Diego for doctoral studies.

Career 
 In February 1990, Yu performed research on anti-cancer medicines and intratumoral therapy. It was at the time he researched on drug slow-release system therapy (SRST).
 
 In 1992, Yu joined Salk Institute in La Jolla, California as Senior Associate Researcher for tumour and cancer genes. A year later, he was appointed as Associate Professor at the University of California, San Diego.
 
 In 1998, he returned to China and founded TaiMei Baofa Cancer Hospital in Dongping, China.
 
 In 2003, Yu was elected as the deputy of the 10th National People's Congress.
 
 At present, he is the CEO of Immuno Oncology Systems (IOS) & Baofa Therapy Inc.

Hospitals 
Taimei Baofa Cancer Hospital was the first hospital established among three of Dr. Yu's hospital. Since 1997, it has raised 38 million yuan (US$4.6 million). Yu also invited experts from Beijing and Jinan to offer training to his medical staff occasionally.

His hospitals utilizes various cancer treatments including surgery, radiotherapy, biological therapy, UMIPIC, as well as traditional Chinese medical treatments.

Awards 
 2006- China Youth Volunteer Action Contribution Award
 2005- First overseas Chinese "Outstanding Entrepreneurship Award"

Patents

Publications

References

External links 
 Baofa Therapy.com
 Baofa UMIPIC Therapy
 Shandong Baofa Oncotherapy Corporation Limited
 Beijing BaoFa Tumour Hospital

1958 births
Living people
Chinese oncologists
Cancer researchers
China Zhi Gong Party politicians
People from Jinan
Scientists from Shandong
Peking Union Medical College alumni
University of California, San Diego faculty
Physicians from Shandong
Delegates to the 10th National People's Congress
21st-century Chinese physicians